Robert Fish may refer to:
Robert L. Fish, American author
Robert Fish (footballer), English footballer
Robert Fish (shipbuilder)
Bobby Fish, wrestler
Bob Fish, NASCAR

See also
Robert "Fish" Jones